The Embassy Gulf Service Station is a service station in Washington, D.C., located on P Street near Dupont Circle and at the entrance to the Georgetown neighborhood. Constructed in 1937, it was added to the National Register of Historic Places in 1993.

History

The station was designed in 1936 by Gulf Oil Corporation's architect P. L. R. Hogner as part of a company drive to create buildings that looked less like gas stations and more like banks and libraries in their details, materials, and massing.

The Embassy Gulf Service Station was to be Gulf Oil's 61st station within the city of Washington. Because its site was next to Rock Creek Park, the building's design was reviewed and modified somewhat by the Commission of Fine Arts, the National Park Service, and the National Capital Park and Planning Commission. The final design called for a small building of grey stone similar in color to the church opposite the station; whether or not the two buildings harmonized by design is unknown.

The Embassy Gulf Service Station was listed on the National Register of Historic Places on September 30, 1993.

See also
 National Register of Historic Places listings in the District of Columbia

Notes

References
 National Register

External links
 

Energy infrastructure completed in 1937
Transport infrastructure completed in 1937
1937 establishments in Washington, D.C.
Dupont Circle
Neoclassical architecture in Washington, D.C.
Retail buildings in Washington, D.C.
Transportation buildings and structures on the National Register of Historic Places in Washington, D.C.
Gas stations on the National Register of Historic Places in Washington, D.C.
Gulf Oil